The  2012 AFF Women's Championship was football tournament held from 13 September to 22 September 2012 in Vietnam. All games were played at the Thong Nhat Stadium, Ho Chi Minh City.

Host nation Vietnam won their second title after beating Myanmar in the final via penalty shoot-out.

Group stage
All times listed are UTC+7.

Group A

Group B

Knockout stage

Semi-finals

Third place match

Final

Awards

Goalscorers
7 goals
 Nguyễn Thị Muôn

6 goals
 San San Maw
 Junpen Seesraum

5 goals
 Heather Cooke
 Nguyễn Thị Minh Nguyệt

3 goals

 Khin Moe Wai
 Nilar Myint
 Kanjana Sung-Ngoen
 Taneekarn Dangda
 Nguyễn Thị Hòa

2 goals

 Souphavanh Phayvanh
 Kamaliah Hashim
 Yee Yee Oo
 Chidtawan Chawong
 Anootsara Maijarern
 Rattikan Thongsombut
 Nguyễn Thị Tuyết Dung
 Lê Thu Thanh Hương

1 goals

 Keota Phongoudom
 Suchitta Phonharath
 Masturah Majid
 Zaryatie Zakaria
 Thidar Oo
 Abigail Komarc
 Patrice Impelido
 Marice Magdolot   
 Samantha Nierras
 Wilaiporn Boothduang
 Nisa Romyen
 Duangnapa Sritala
 Chương Thị Kiều
 Nguyễn Thị Kim Tiến
 Nguyễn Thị Xuyến
 Trần Thị Kim Hồng

1 own goal
 Shida Baker (playing against Myanmar)

Final ranking

References

External links
 ASEAN Football Federation Official site
 AFF Women's Championship 2012

Women's
2012 in Vietnamese football
2012
2012